is a Japanese motorcycle road racer. He is a two-time champion in the All-Japan Superbike Championship, and has competed sporadically in the MotoGP World Championship.

He is known in his native Japan as a competitor in the MFJ All Japan Road Race GP250 Championship, and most notably the All Japan Superbike championship, where he has enjoyed success with the Yoshimura Suzuki team riding a Suzuki GSX-R1000. In July 2007 he, along with Yukio Kagayama, won the Suzuka 8 Hours endurance race on a Yoshimura Suzuki bike.

Career

National racing
Akiyoski made his début in the All Japan GP250 Championship in 1995, riding a Suzuki RGV250. He finished in 24th in his first season, before improving to 10th the following season. In 1997, Akiyoshi moved into the All Japan Superbike Championship – later the All Japan JSB1000 Championship – where he has spent the majority of his career. He won the championship in 2010 and 2011, riding a Honda CBR1000RR.

Grand Prix appearances
Akiyoshi has also competed in a number of Grands Prix of the MotoGP series. These have included The Japanese Grand Prix at Motegi, where he finished 13th on his debut with the Rizla Suzuki team as a wildcard rider, as well as two races in 2007 at Jerez and Japan. He came 17th at the Spanish race, and had a good run in Japan where he was running 7th behind Casey Stoner, but retired four laps from the finish. In 2008, he competed in the Japanese Grand Prix for a third year running, again for Rizla Suzuki. He retired on lap 1 after going down at the first corner.

In the 2010 season, Akiyoshi stood in for the injured Hiroshi Aoyama at the Interwetten Honda team. He competed in two races for the team, finishing 15th at the Dutch TT in Assen and 13th at the Catalan Grand Prix in Catalunya. He was then replaced by San Marinese rider Alex de Angelis. Akiyoshi replaced Aoyama once again at the Gresini Racing team for the 2011 Dutch TT, however not through injury, as Aoyama himself replaced the injured Dani Pedrosa at Repsol Honda. Akiyoshi also competed at the Japanese Grand Prix as a wildcard entry with LCR Honda – along with Shinichi Itoh, racing for HRC Honda – as a gesture of support for those affected by the March 2011 Tōhoku earthquake and tsunami.

Career statistics

Races by year
(key)

Suzuka 8 Hours results

Asia Superbike 1000

Races by year
(key) (Races in bold indicate pole position; races in italics indicate fastest lap)

References

External links

 Kousuke Akiyoshi official website 
 Official MotoGP homepage

Japanese motorcycle racers
Repsol Honda MotoGP riders
Living people
1975 births
People from Kurume
Suzuki MotoGP riders
Gresini Racing MotoGP riders
LCR Team MotoGP riders
MotoGP World Championship riders